James Macaulay may refer to:

James Macaulay (Canadian physician) (died 1822)
James Macaulay (editor) (1817–1902), 19th century Scottish physician, journalist and anti-vivisectionist
James Macaulay (preacher), 17th century Scottish preacher and prisoner on the Bass Rock
James Buchanan Macaulay (1793–1859), lawyer and judge in colonial Canada
James Macaulay (footballer) (1922–2000), Scottish footballer
Jim Macaulay, musician

See also
James McAuley (1917–1976), academic and poet
Jimmy McAuley (1901–?), Irish footballer
James Macauley (1889–1945), Irish footballer
James McAulay (1860–1943), Scottish footballer